Robert Gerry may refer to:
 Robert Gerry (politician) (1858–1931), American politician
 Robert Livingston Gerry Sr. (1877–1957), American thoroughbred horse owner and breeder 
 Robert L. Gerry Jr. (1911–1979), American polo player
 Robert L. Gerry III (born 1937), American businessman and petroleum industry executive